is a railway station in the city of Susono, Shizuoka Prefecture, Japan, operated by the East Japan Railway Company (JR Tōkai ).

Lines

Station layout

The station has a single island platform. The station building has automated ticket machines, TOICA automated turnstiles and a staffed ticket office. It is located to the west of tracks and is connected to the platform with a footbridge.

Platforms

History 
The station first opened as  under the Japanese Government Railways (JGR), (the predecessor to the post-war Japanese National Railways) on February 1, 1889. It was renamed Susono Station on July 15, 1915. After the opening of the Tanna Tunnel on December 1, 1934, it became a station of the Gotemba Line. Regularly scheduled freight services were discontinued on March 10, 1974 and baggage-handling services from February 1, 1984. Along with its division and privatization of JNR on April 1, 1987, the station came under the control and operation of JR Central.

Station numbering was introduced to the Gotemba Line in March 2018; Susono Station was assigned station number CB14.

Passenger statistics
In fiscal 2017, the station was used by an average of 2566 passengers daily (boarding passengers only).

Surrounding area
Susono City Hall
Susono High School

See also
 List of Railway Stations in Japan

References

External links

 Official website 

Railway stations in Japan opened in 1889
Railway stations in Shizuoka Prefecture
Gotemba Line
Stations of Central Japan Railway Company
Susono, Shizuoka